The 2020 Mountain West Conference men's basketball tournament was the postseason men's basketball tournament for the Mountain West Conference. It was held from March 4–7, 2020 at the Thomas & Mack Center on the campus of University of Nevada, Las Vegas, in Las Vegas, Nevada. Utah State upset heavily favored San Diego State to earn the Mountain West's automatic bid to the NCAA tournament

Seeds
All 11 MW schools were eligible to participate in the tournament. Teams were seeded by conference record. Ties were broken by record between the tied teams, followed by record against the regular-season champion, if necessary. As a result, the top five teams receive byes into the tournament quarterfinals. The remaining teams will play in the first round. Tie-breaking procedures remained unchanged from the 2019 tournament, except that RPI was replaced by the NCAA's new NET rating.
 Head-to-head record between the tied teams
 Record against the highest-seeded team not involved in the tie, going down through the seedings as necessary
 Higher NET

Schedule

Bracket

* denotes overtime period

See also
2020 Mountain West Conference women's basketball tournament

References

Tournament
Mountain West Conference men's basketball tournament
College basketball tournaments in Nevada
Mountain West Conference men's basketball tournament
Mountain West Conference men's basketball tournament
College sports tournaments in Nevada